"Age Ain't Nothin' But a #" is a song by American rapper Chi-Ali. It was released on February 11, 1992 as a lead single from the rapper's only studio album The Fabulous Chi-Ali through Relativity Records. The song was written by Chi-Ali & Baby Chris and produced by Mista Lawnge. The single reached number 6 on the Billboard Hot Rap Singles chart.

Track listing

Personnel
Chi-Ali Griffith – lyrics, vocals
Andrew "Dr. Butcher" Venable – scratches
William "Mista Lawnge" McLean – producer
The Beatnuts – producers
Darrel Steven Lighty – lyrics, executive producer
"Lightning" Lisle Leete – engineering

Charts

References

External links

1992 singles
Chi-Ali songs
1992 songs